Winter Park station is a train station in Winter Park, Florida. It is served by SunRail, the commuter rail system of Greater Orlando, and Amtrak, the national passenger rail system of the United States. The current station was built in 2014, replacing earlier stations going back to 1882.

History 
The original Winter Park depot was built in 1882 by the South Florida Railroad ten years after it built a line from Sanford to Orlando. A newer passenger station was built in 1913 by the Atlantic Coast Line Railroad (ACL) and included a freight depot, which is located to the south of the current station. The freight depot was in use by the railroad until 1982 when it was purchased by the city. It is now used as a farmer's market and as a venue for weddings and other special events.  A newer modern station was built by the ACL in 1962 directly adjacent to a large city park known as Central Park. It was located one block away from Park Avenue, a street that is lined with upscale boutiques and restaurants.

On February 14, 2013, Pillar Construction Group of Clermont, FL began work on a new $1.2 million station building, which replaced the 1962 era depot. The new station, which was designed in the Craftsman-style to better blend with the city's architecture, includes an improved lobby, artwork and larger restrooms. The new depot was primarily funded through a $950,000 grant from the Federal Transit Administration's Bus & Bus Facilities program, which was matched with more than $237,000 in local funding from the city. Following the grand opening of the new station on March 3, 2014, the historic ACL depot was closed and demolished.

In addition to Amtrak, Winter Park station serves as a stop on the SunRail commuter rail system. Operations began on May 1, 2014. Unlike most SunRail stations, which feature canopies consisting of white aluminum poles supporting sloped green roofs, Winter Park's canopies have traditional white gabled roofs. It also includes ticket vending machines, ticket validators, emergency call boxes, drinking fountains, separate platforms designed for passengers in wheelchairs.

SunRail ridership 
On average, the SunRail station at Winter Park sees an average of 779 daily boardings.

Connections 
 Lynx: 1, 9, 14, 23, 102, 443

References

External links 

Winter Park – SunRail
Winter Park Amtrak Station – USA Rail Guide (Train Web)

Amtrak stations in Florida
Atlantic Coast Line Railroad stations
SunRail stations
Transportation buildings and structures in Orange County, Florida
Buildings and structures in Winter Park, Florida
1882 establishments in Florida
Railway stations in the United States opened in 1882